China Records was a record label founded 1 October 1984 by Derek Green. Its top-selling artists were Art of Noise, Morcheeba and the Levellers.

In 1986 and 1987, China Records releases were manufactured and marketed worldwide by Chrysalis Records, and then by Polydor Records in 1988 through 1990. From 1991 the labels UK releases were made and distributed by Pinnacle Records, with material being licensed to various other labels for international release. In February 1992 Derek Green quit the BPI over their stance on the independent chart, whilst the label distribution went major in 1997 when it was acquired by Warner Music Group. With this deal, China was distributed through Discovery Records in the US, and is now being distributed through Sire Records since Discovery folded. Overseas releases are handled primarily by Warner Manufacturing Europe.

Sub-labels
 Indochina Records - a dance offshoot featuring acts such as Morcheeba.

Artists

 Kevin Kitchen
 Art of Noise
 Blameless
 Daniel Davies and Jonna Parkes
 The Dogs D'Amour
 The Egg
 The Fountainhead
 Gods of Luxury
 Green On Red
 Levellers
 Loud
 Morcheeba
 The Name
 Cheap & Nasty
 Rialto
 Labi Siffre
 The Wishplants
 Ugly As Sin
 Zion Train

See also
 List of record labels

References

External links

British record labels
Record labels established in 1984
Record labels disestablished in 1997
Indie rock record labels